Terdell Middleton (April 8, 1955 – April 3, 2015) was an American professional football player who was a running back for seven seasons in the National Football League (NFL). Born in Memphis, Tennessee, he was originally a third round pick in the 1977 NFL Draft by the St. Louis Cardinals, Middleton was traded to the Green Bay Packers in the preseason. He went to the Pro Bowl after the 1978 season, when he ran for 1,116 yards, sixth best in the NFL. He also played in the USFL for the Memphis Showboats in 1984.

Middleton died in Memphis on April 3, 2015, five days short of his 60th birthday.

References

1955 births
2015 deaths
Players of American football from Memphis, Tennessee
American football running backs
Green Bay Packers players
Tampa Bay Buccaneers players
Chicago Blitz players
Memphis Showboats players
National Conference Pro Bowl players
Memphis Tigers football players